The Québec Pavilion was a pavilion at Expo 67 in Montreal on Notre Dame Island.  It featured modern architecture and exhibited Quebec's urban and industrial growth.

Overview
Modern lines characterized the architecture of the Québec Pavilion. Its exterior walls were made of glass; by day, these were enormous rectangular mirrors and, by night, an illuminated display case. Surrounded by water, the structure was accessible by a footbridge. Visitors then entered by large elevators; inside the pavilion. The pavilion's modern architecture and interior exhibit were in sharp contrast to the traditional image Canadians then had of this province. The exhibits focusing on urbanization, industrialization, business and education presented Quebec as a province with its eye on the future. Natural resources, forestry and water in particular were also presented as growth industries. In this reflection of Quebec society, the minimalist display methods themselves were an attraction: thousands of coloured steel cubes were used as part of the exhibits which was bathed in an electronic score by Quebec composer Gilles Tremblay in which synthesized whir, twitter and roar complemented the visual suggestions. High overhead, the distinctive soundtracks collided and coalesced into a contrapuntal aural landscape.

The building and the adjacent French pavilion are now part of the Montreal Casino.

Architecture and exhibition design
The Québec Pavilion displayed a minimal approach to form. The construction, by Montreal architects Papineau Gérin-Lajoie Le Blanc and Luc Durand, was composed of concrete floors and Vierendeel structural steel supported by four steel towers.

The avant-garde design of the Québec Pavilion’s exhibition was the work of Swiss designer, Gustave Maeder. The themes were integrated to the pavilion's the modern architecture through cubic modules. The cubes became the receptacles for exhibition items or became themselves the object of the exhibits through sculptural form. The themes explored: Man’s Challenge, Man’s Struggle, and Drive, defined the beginning of Quebec’s people’s trajectory towards the future. The 4,200 x 24 inch (60cm) sided steel cubes took on different shapes. 

The theme of Challenge was experienced by the visitors as they were taken up the cylindrical elevators up to the mezzanine floor. In this journey, the visitors witnessed a kaleidoscopic show expressing the passing of the seasons which represented the challenge which the original French settlers encountered. From the mezzanine, visitors got an overview of the theme of Struggle by walking the downward sloping ramp. In clockwise order, the visitor saw representations of Quebec’s Conquest of nature; its Water, Forest, Earth, and Underground which would subsequently be transformed by Industry. Once on the ground floor, the visitor found himself in visiting the contemporary lifestyle of Montreal, then Canada's metropolis. Finally, visitors would wander through the exhibits and at the center of the pavilion was the theme Drive; a look into the province's potential. The path the visitors walked took on an important meaning, they were led on a promenade that allowed them to experience Quebec’s history. Films, photographs and transparencies were also used to visualize Quebec’s social, political, cultural and economical ripening.

Recognition

Visiting Montreal in April 1967, Ada Louise Huxtable, The New York Times architecture critic praised the Québec Pavilion calling it the Barcelona Pavilion of Expo 67:

"Quebec is the Barcelona Pavilion of 1967... [The Quebec Pavilion] combines an exceptionally refined work of contemporary architecture with an exhibition design that is a three-dimensional sensory abstraction of sight and electronic sound that says, suddenly, and stunningly, what a 1967 exhibit should be".

Toronto Star’s Robert Fulford called it:

"Cool and restrained and sophisticated…Rarely can there ever have been a large exhibition so pure, so rarified as this one… The severe spirit of Mondrian fills the Quebec Pavilion".

References

Bibliography
Lownsbrough, John (2012). The History of Canada Series: The Best Place To Be: Expo '67 And Its Time, Penguin Canada, 
Hénault, Odile (2016). Architects of the Quiet Revolution, Canadian Architect.

External links

1960s in Quebec
Buildings and structures completed in 1967
Buildings and structures in Montreal
Expo 67
Modernist architecture in Canada
World's fair architecture in Montreal